Timothy Howard Bishop (born June 1, 1950) is an American politician who served as a U.S. Representative for  from 2003 to 2015. He is a member of the Democratic Party.

The district includes most of Central and Eastern Suffolk County, including most of Smithtown, as well as the entirety of the towns of Brookhaven, Riverhead, Southold, Southampton, East Hampton, and Shelter Island. The district encompasses wealthy enclaves such as the Hamptons, middle-class suburban towns such as Selden, Centereach and Lake Grove, working-class neighborhoods such as Mastic and Riverhead, and rural farming communities such as Mattituck and Jamesport on the North Fork.

Early life, education and career
Bishop is a twelfth-generation resident of Southampton, New York, where he was born on June 1, 1950. He is the son of Catherine (Roesel) and Howard Cortland Bishop. He is the great-grandson of Benjamin H. Bishop, a mayor of Southampton, and has English, Irish, and German ancestry. He received a bachelor's degree in History from The College of the Holy Cross and a master's degree in Public Administration from Long Island University.  Bishop served as Provost of Southampton College for 16 years, where he began working in 1973 as an admissions counselor.

In his nearly 29 years at LIU's Southampton College, Bishop served in positions touching almost every aspect of college life, from institutional research and planning, financial aid, and enrollment services, to student activities, personnel, community relations, and fund raising. He served as director of financial aid, assistant director of admissions, registrar, director of institutional research and planning, dean for enrollment services, and dean for administrative and student services. In 1986, Bishop was appointed Provost of Southampton College. In this position, Bishop served as the chief executive officer in charge of the day-to-day management of the entire campus. Known as a strong and capable administrator, Congressman Bishop worked effectively with the college's diverse constituencies including students, alumni, staff, faculty, University officers, board members, government officials and community residents.

During his tenure, several academic programs achieved national prominence.   Southampton College of Long Island University produced 36 Fulbright Scholars, a remarkable achievement for a small college. As provost, Bishop developed the award-winning Cooperative Education and Freshman Programs, an integral part of the LIU Plan implemented across the University. Bishop negotiated the licensing agreement to power up the University's flagship radio station WPBX the only Long Island-based NPR affiliate — to 25,000 Watts. During his tenure, four new graduate programs were added to the curriculum, and a new academic center, Chancellors Hall, was built.

Along with the Southampton College Chancellor, Robert F. X. Sillerman, Bishop developed the most successful single fund-raising event in the college's history, the All for the Sea rock concerts which grossed as much as $1 million annually.

Congressional tenure

Bishop supported and voted for the Affordable Care Act and the Health Care and Education Reconciliation Act of 2010.

Bishop also voted for the Housing and Economic Recovery Act of 2008, the Emergency Economic Stabilization Act (TARP), and the American Recovery and Reinvestment Act of 2009 (also known as the "stimulus bill"), and for further measures in 2009 and 2010.  He also voted for the Budget Control Act of 2011, which provided for further gradual increments in the debt limit.

Bishop participated in the bipartisan coalition of elected officials and community advocates that saved the 106th Air Rescue Wing located at Gabreski Airport from being shut down by the Pentagon's base closure commission.

In opposition to a plan that would have dumped more than twenty million cubic yards of contaminated dredge waste in the Long Island Sound, Bishop sponsored legislation to block the plan. In January 2007, he voted for a reduction of interest rates on future federal student loans.

Bishop supported the Shinnecock Indian tribe's successful attempts at gaining formal federal recognition. Bishop supported a $160,000 line-item for the Shinnecock Nation in President Obama's 2013 budget proposal.

Committee assignments
Committee on Education and the Workforce
Subcommittee on Workforce Protections
Subcommittee on Higher Education and Workforce Training
Committee on Transportation and Infrastructure
Subcommittee on Coast Guard and Maritime Transportation
Subcommittee on Railroads, Pipelines, and Hazardous Materials
Subcommittee on Water Resources and the Environment (Ranking Member)
Subcommittee on Highways and Transit

Caucus memberships
    National Archives Caucus, Co-Chair
    Democratic Budget Group, Co-Chair
    Coalition for Autism Research and Education (CARE)
    Community College Caucus
    Congressional Caucus on Armenian Issues
    Congressional Arts Caucus
    Congressional Caucus on Addiction, Treatment and Recovery
    Congressional Civility Caucus
    Congressional Humanities Caucus
    Congressional Labor and Working Families Caucus
    Congressional Long Island Sound Caucus
    Congressional Military Family Caucus
    Congressional Shipbuilding Caucus
    Congressional Sri Lanka Caucus
    Congressional Wine Caucus
    House Cancer Caucus
    House Democratic Caucus
    House Renewable Energy and Energy Efficiency Caucus
    House National Service Caucus
    Sudan Caucus
    Sustainable Energy and Environment Coalition
   United Services Organization (USO) Congressional Caucus

Ethics investigation

In September 2013, the Office of Congressional Ethics recommended further review of an August 2012 incident in which Bishop was accused of soliciting a campaign contribution from hedge fund magnate Eric Semler in exchange for acting in an official capacity to obtain a fireworks permit for Semler's son's bar mitzvah on Long Island. Bishop denied the allegations as "outrageous, unfounded attacks on my character and my family". After the incident was picked up by the media, Semler called the allegations a "nonstory".
 	
The Federal Bureau of Investigation investigated the incident. In September 2014, the Justice Department closed its investigation without filing charges.

Political campaigns

2002

In his first political race, Bishop ran as a Democrat against Republican incumbent Felix J. Grucci, Jr. During the campaign, Grucci ran radio ads accusing Bishop of falsifying rape statistics at  Southampton College, but his claims were based on articles from a college newspaper that contained numerous inaccuracies. Grucci refused to repudiate the ads, and was defeated by Bishop.

2004

Incumbent Bishop beat Republican William M. Manger, Jr. 56.2%-43.8%

2006

Incumbent Bishop beat Republican Italo Zanzi 62.2%-37.8%

2008

Incumbent Bishop defeated Republican Lee Zeldin 58%-42% and was re-elected.

2010

Bishop narrowly defeated Republican Randy Altschuler by a margin of 50.2% to 49.8% after Altschuler conceded the race when trailing by 263 votes.

2012

Bishop again defeated Republican Randy Altschuler by a 52.2%-47.8% margin. Although Bishop received the Independence Party endorsement in most of his previous elections, in 2012 the endorsement went instead to his opponent.

2014

Bishop ran unopposed for the Democratic, Working Families and Independence Party nominations. He was a member of the Democratic Congressional Campaign Committee's Frontline Program, a program designed to help protect vulnerable Democratic incumbents heading into the 2014 election. He faced Republican nominee Lee Zeldin, whom he had defeated in 2008, in the general election.
On November 4, 2014, Bishop lost his re-election bid to Zeldin 55% to 45%.

Post-Congressional career
After leaving Congress, Bishop joined St. Joseph's College as a distinguished professor of Civic Engagement and Public Service.  Among Bishop's many responsibilities at the College he will be afforded the opportunity to continue his lifelong work of providing access to Higher Education to traditional underserved populations.

Bishop is a senior advisor to a Washington, D.C.-based government relations firm.

Bishop has accepted positions on the Board of Directors of Social Accountability International and The Sergeant Sullivan Center. Both commitments allow Bishop to continue on two of his top priorities in the Congress — working to ensure workplace protections and services to U.S. veterans, particularly in the area of post deployment health.

On March 20, 2018, Bishop was confirmed by the Suffolk County Legislature to a five-year term on the Suffolk County Water Authority (SCWA).

Personal life
Bishop is married to Kathryn, founder and director of The Children's School Early Childhood program at Southampton College, and has two daughters, Molly and Meghan. He is a Roman Catholic.

References

External links

 
Profile at SourceWatch

|-

1950 births
College of the Holy Cross alumni
Democratic Party members of the United States House of Representatives from New York (state)
Living people
Long Island University alumni
People from Southampton (town), New York
Politicians from Suffolk County, New York
21st-century American politicians